William LeBaron (February 16, 1883February 9, 1958) was an American film producer. LeBaron's film credits included Cimarron, which won the Academy Award for Outstanding Production at the 4th Academy Awards ceremony for 1930/1931. LeBaron also produced landmark comedy features from W. C. Fields, Mae West and Wheeler and Woolsey. In addition to being a producer, LeBaron served as the last production chief of Film Booking Offices of America and at FBO's successor, RKO Pictures, where he was replaced by David O. Selznick.

Biography
LeBaron was born in Elgin, Illinois on February 16, 1883. After graduating from high school, he attended the University of Chicago and New York University, and then spent a decade writing musical scores and lyrics for Broadway shows. He then wrote for some magazines and publications, before Joseph Kennedy, an investor in several of LeBaron's plays, suggested that LeBaron move to California in 1924. He joined the American Society of Composers, Authors and Publishers (ASCAP) in 1933 and became a production chief at several studios, including RKO Studios (1929-1931), Paramount Studios (1936-1941) and 20th Century Fox (1941 until his retirement in 1947).

LeBaron died on February 9, 1958, a week before his 75th birthday, and was buried in Chapel of the Pines Crematory. He was married to Mabel Hollins (1887-1955), a British musical comedy actress.

Selected filmography 

 Beau Geste (1926)
 It's the Old Army Game (1926)
 Love 'Em and Leave 'Em (1926)
 The Show-Off (1926)
 Running Wild (1927)
 Love's Greatest Mistake (1927)
 Blind Alleys (1927)
 Lightning Speed (1928)
 Street Girl (1929)
 Side Street (1929)
 Rio Rita (1929)
 Beau Bandit (1930)
 Hit the Deck (1930)
 Hook, Line and Sinker (1930)
 Midnight Mystery (1930)
 The Case of Sergeant Grischa (1930)
 The Fall Guy (1930)
 Conspiracy (1930)
 She's My Weakness (1930)
 Traveling Husbands (1931)
 Cimarron (1931)
 The Sin Ship (1931)
 The Lady Refuses (1931)
 Laugh and Get Rich (1931)
 Kept Husbands (1931)
 Cracked Nuts (1931)
 The Public Defender (1931)
 She Done Him Wrong (1933)
 Baby Face (1933)
 I'm No Angel (1933)
 Belle of the Nineties (1934)
 It's a Gift (1934)
 Man on the Flying Trapeze (1935)
 Klondike Annie (1936)
 Forgotten Faces (1936)
 The Princess Comes Across (1936)
 Till We Meet Again (1936)
 Born to the West (1937)
 Night of Mystery (1937)
 The Buccaneer (1938)
 Television Spy (1939)
 Emergency Squad (1940)
 Golden Gloves (1940)
 Dr. Cyclops (1940)
 Week-End in Havana (1941)
 Orchestra Wives (1942)
 Footlight Serenade (1942)
 Iceland (1942)
 Springtime in the Rockies (1942)
 The Gang's All Here (1943)
 Stormy Weather (1943)
 Pin Up Girl (1944)
 Carnegie Hall (1947)

References

External links 

 
 

1883 births
1958 deaths
American film producers
Burials at Chapel of the Pines Crematory